Universalist Herald is a publication of the Universalist Herald Publishing company. "Universalist Heritage and Spirit Today" and "The Oldest Continuously Published Liberal Religious Periodical in North America" are the subtitles of the modern edition.

Overview
Founded in 1847 as the Religious Reformer by C. F. R. Shehane of Wetumpka, Alabama. Beginning January 1, 1850 it became The Universalist Herald and was edited by John Crenshaw Buruss. For many years it was strictly a regional publication, serving the Universalist Church of America in Southeastern United States.

In 1896, John M. Bowers purchased and moved the paper to Canon, Georgia, and remained as publishing editor to 1911. From 1911 to 1991, it continued to be published in Canon, Georgia, under an arrangement with the Georgia Universalist Convention, serving as a regional oriented periodical. There was a succession of local editors, notably Nellie Mann Opdale, Argyle E. Houser, and Haynie Summers. Then it began to shift its focus away from regional interests with editor William Balkan from 1985 to 1991, followed by Vernon Chandler and then Justin Lapoint. From 2004 to 2012, the editor was Rich Koster, a retired minister and former truck driver who still writes with the pen name Raven. The most recent editor is David Damico of LeRoy, New York, a member of First Universalist Church of Rochester, New York, and a college professor of graphic design.

The Herald'''s main church connection was the Universalist Church of America, and then since 1961 with the Unitarian Universalist Association of Churches. It has a broader outlook and has subscribers from all over the U.S. and around the world. The corporate office is in Seven Springs, North Carolina, and the business office is in Dorchester, Massachusetts.The Universalist Herald'' is published quarterly, is owned by the Universalist Herald Publishing Company, and is governed by a Board of Directors: Linda Foshee, Hattiesburg, Mississippi; Joyce Gilbert, Rochester, New York; Rich Koster, Fort Thomas, Kentucky; Ann Malpass, Mount Olive, North Carolina; Peggy Rawheiser, Wilmington, North Carolina; Doug Shaheen, Dorchester, Massachusetts; Ken Vincent, Houston, Texas.

References

External links
 Universalist Herald at www.Universalist-Herald.org

1847 establishments in Alabama
Religious magazines published in the United States
Biweekly magazines published in the United States
Christian magazines
Magazines established in 1847
Universalist Church of America
Magazines published in Alabama
Magazines published in Georgia (U.S. state)